Two River Group Holdings is a New York-based venture capital firm and merchant bank focused on the life science sector. It specializes in investments in life science, biotechnology, and in firms focused on developing preventive and therapeutic technologies for a broad spectrum of disease areas including oncology, cardiovascular disease, neurological disorders, and companion animal health care.

Two River was founded in September 2004 by partners Joshua Kazam, Peter Kash, David Tanen and Benjamin Bernstein. Dr. Arie Belldegrun joined the firm in 2008 as Chairman and Partner.

The firm has offices in New York City and Los Angeles.

Portfolio

Currently, Two River holds equity stakes in the following life science companies:

Allogene Therapeutics - biotechnology company.
Breakthrough Properties -  life science real estate development company
Hubble - brand of contact lenses sold directly to consumers through an e-commerce, subscription-only model.
Kronos Bio - research and development of therapies that modulate historically recalcitrant cancer targets.
Neogene Therapeutics - biomedical company developing T cell therapies that target mutated proteins (neo-antigens) in cancer.
UroGen Pharma - clinical-stage biopharmaceutical company developing therapies with a focus on uro-oncology.

Past holdings:

Arno Therapeutics - clinical-stage biopharmaceutical company that is developing products for the treatment of cancer.
Capricor Therapeutics (- clinical stage biotechnology company developing biological therapies for cardiac and other serious medical conditions.
Cell Design Labs (acquired by Gilead Sciences) - private biotherapeutics company pioneering breakthrough science to develop disruptive cell-based therapies for cancer and other devastating diseases. Cell Design Labs leverages the power of the body's immune system to develop smart, living therapies with the capability to treat our most challenging diseases with unprecedented power, precision, safety and durability.
Edgemont Pharmaceuticals - privately held pharmaceutical company in the field of neuroscience. 
Kite Pharma (acquired by Gilead Sciences) - clinical-stage biopharmaceutical company focused on developing engineered autologous cell therapy products for the treatment of cancer.
Sienna Biopharmaceuticals - discovery, clinical development and commercialization of products in dermatology and aesthetics
Velcera (acquired by Perrigo) - develops pet medicines in pain management, anti-allergy and parasiticides
Veterinary Prime - pet nutrition products for dogs and cats, sold through veterinarians.

Business history

 In May 2013, Kite Pharma completed a $35 million financing of Series A preferred stock.
 In October 2013, Arno Therapeutics completed a $30.7 million financing of equity.
 In November 2013, Nile Therapeutics completed a merger with Capricor to form Capricor Therapeutics. Capricor has become a wholly owned subsidiary of Nile.
 In February 2014, Velcera was acquired by Perrigo for $160 million.
 In April 2014, Kite Pharma completed a $50 million mezzanine private financing of convertible notes, and in May, the company filed a registration with the SEC for an IPO of its common stock, with a proposed maximum offering price of $115 million. The company listed on the NASDAQ Global Market under the symbol "KITE." The company planned to raise $78 million by offering 6 million shares at a price range of $12.00 to $14.00. At the midpoint of the proposed range, Kite Pharma would command a market value of $548 million. On June 20, 2014, 7.5 million shares of Kite Pharma, priced at $17 a share began trading on the NASDAQ, indicating a market valuation of $632.4 million for the company.
 In March 2017, it was reported that Two River has participated in a $16.5 million Series A round of funding for Hubble.
 On October 11, 2018, Allogene Therapeutics raised $324 million in an initial public offering on the NASDAQ, listing under the ticker "ALLO".

References

Financial services companies established in 2004
Investment banking private equity groups
Private equity firms of the United States
Companies based in New York (state)
Venture capital firms of the United States
Investment companies based in New York City